Love beyond frontiers – Made in Japan (original title: 'Grenzeloze liefde - Made in Japan') is a 1996 Dutch documentary film by the director Puck de Leeuw. The documentary tells the story of two Dutch women and one Flemish woman, living in Japan with their Japanese husbands and coping with their new way of life. The documentary is part 1 of the series 'Love beyond frontiers'. The other documentary film in this series is part 2, 'Love beyond frontiers; made in Africa'. Part 3, 'Love beyond frontiers; made in USA' was never made.

Awards
 IDFA Zapper award (1996)

External links
 
 Love beyond frontiers - Made in Japan documentary online
 IDFA site description Grenzeloze liefde - Made in Japan

1996 films
1996 documentary films
Dutch documentary films
1990s Dutch-language films
Documentary films about Japan